Loot Rascals is a turn-based strategy roguelike video game developed and published by British independent game studio Hollow Ponds. The game released on March 7, 2017, for Microsoft Windows and PlayStation 4. Loot Rascals received mixed reviews from critics.

Development 
Hollow Ponds announced Loot Rascals for PC and PlayStation 4 on May 25, 2016, with a release date of early 2017.

Reception 

Loot Rascals received "mixed or average" reviews according to review aggregator Metacritic.

Push Squares Kell Andersen rated the game 6/10 stars, calling it an "intriguing" and a "infectiously charming" roguelike. Andersen praised the central mechanics of the game, but criticized the card-based stat system as offering "little strategic variety". He also felt that the game's procedural generation could be "frustrating".

Nick Valdez of Destructoid rated the game 8.5/10.

Reviewing for Game Informer, Suriel Vazquez wrote that the game's deck-building was "smart", the combat was "breezy", and the strategy layer was "interesting". Vazquez felt that the combination of procedural generation and the game's difficulty made him feel like a "victim of chance" instead of a "mastermind".

GameSpots James O'Connor gave the game a 5/10, praising the visuals and monster design, but believed that the game did not have "enough narrative substance to create long-term investment".

References

External links
Official website 

2017 video games
Indie video games
PlayStation 4 games
Roguelike video games
Turn-based strategy video games
Video games developed in the United Kingdom
Windows games